Margaret Bell-Byars (born July 29, 1962) is an American gospel musician, who is a traditional black gospel and Christian R&B recording artist. She started her music career, in 1980, when enrolled at Oral Roberts University, signing in their choir. Her only studio album, Over and Over, was released in 1991, with Warner Alliance Music. This album was her breakthrough release upon the Billboard magazine charts.

Early life
Bell-Byars was born on July 29, 1962, in Detroit, Michigan, to Jesse Garfield and Mildred Bell, where her father was the pastor of Mount Everett Church of God in Christ, while she was raised with two older sisters, Charlene and Vanessa. She graduated with her baccalaureate degree in broadcasting from Oral Roberts University.

Music career
Her music recording career was brief, where she only released, one studio album, Over and Over, with Warner Alliance Music, in 1991. This album was her breakthrough release upon the Billboard magazine Gospel Albums chart, where it peaked at No. 23.

Personal life
She is married to former professional football player, Keith Byars.

Discography

Studio albums

References

External links
Official YouTube

1962 births
Living people
African-American songwriters
African-American Christians
Musicians from Detroit
Songwriters from Michigan
Warner Records artists
Oral Roberts University alumni
21st-century African-American people
20th-century African-American people